Örnsköldsviks HF, often referred to as Örnsköldvik Hockey, is a Swedish ice hockey club from Örnsköldsvik playing in the third tier of ice hockey in Sweden, Division 1, .  The club was founded in 2010 as a merger of Örnsköldsviks SK's hockey department and KB 65.

Season-by-season

External links
 Official website
 Profile on Eliteprospects.com

Ice hockey teams in Sweden
Sport in Örnsköldsvik
Ice hockey clubs established in 2010
2010 establishments in Sweden
Ice hockey teams in Västernorrland County